We Were Eight Years in Power: An American Tragedy is a 2017 collection of essays by Ta-Nehisi Coates originally published in The Atlantic magazine between 2008 and 2016 over the course of the American Barack Obama administration. It includes the titles that launched his career: "The Case for Reparations" and "The Black Family in the Age of Mass Incarceration". Each of the essays is introduced with the author's reflections.

Time magazine listed We Were Eight Years in Power as one of its top ten non-fiction books of 2017.

Essays 

 "'This Is How We Lost to the White Man'"
 "American Girl"
 "Why Do So Few Blacks Study the Civil War?"
 "The Legacy of Malcolm X"
 "Fear of a Black President"
 "The Case for Reparations"
 "The Black Family in the Age of Mass Incarceration"
 "My President Was Black"

References

Further reading

External links 
 
Presentation by Coates on We Were Eight Years in Power, October 9, 2017, C-SPAN

2017 non-fiction books
American essay collections
Essay collections by Ta-Nehisi Coates
Books about the Obama administration
Books about race and ethnicity
Books about African-American history
English-language books
One World (imprint) books